Marion Stevenson Butts, Jr. (born August 1, 1966) is an American former professional football player who was a running back for seven seasons in the National Football League (NFL) for the San Diego Chargers, the New England Patriots and the Houston Oilers from 1989 to 1995.

Professional career
Butts was immediately used as a starter, for the Chargers. On December 17, 1989, late in his rookie season, he rushed for 176 yards against the Kansas City Chiefs on a Chargers record 39 carries. He led the team (Chargers and Patriots) in rushing his first six seasons. He gained a career-best 1,225 yards in 1990, finishing third in the NFL in rushing yards, despite missing the final two games of the season due to injury. He was elected to the 1990 Pro Bowl. In the 1992 playoffs, Butts rushed 15 times for 119 yards and 1 touchdown against the Chiefs, setting the franchise records with 7.9 yards per carry.

In 1994, citing the new salary cap, as well as declining numbers due to a string of injuries, the Chargers traded Butts to the Patriots for a third- and a fifth-round pick.

NFL career statistics

References

1966 births
Living people
American football running backs
Florida State Seminoles football players
San Diego Chargers players
New England Patriots players
Houston Oilers players
American Conference Pro Bowl players
Players of American football from Georgia (U.S. state)
People from Sylvester, Georgia
Northeastern Oklahoma A&M Golden Norsemen football players